Women's football in Germany is quickly becoming very popular in Germany largely due to the success of the women's national team.

History 
Women in Germany have been playing football since the turn of the 18th century, but women playing sports were frowned upon by the general population and citizens.  The "Sports Girl" did not come into fashion until the 1920s when women started to form their own clubs. Lotte Specht was one of the first female to form a women's only football club. In 1955 the German Football Association declared that they would not permit women into the association stating that women were frail and unable to perform in the sport without injuring themselves. During the 1960s there was discussion about setting up a Woman's Football Association, but it never panned out.

The DFB finally officially allowed women players on October 30, 1970, but there were modifications to the rules. Firstly, women were only allowed to play in warm weather. Secondly, football boots with studs were banned and the ball was smaller and lighter. Lastly, the length of a match was reduced to seventy minutes.

In 1971 a women's league was formed, with many other leagues established during the following years. On September 8, 1974, the first women's champion in football was awarded to TuS Wörrstadt.

The first women's DFB Cup was held in 1981 with SSG 09 Bergisch Gladbach defeating TuS Wörrstadt 5–0 in the final match in front of 35,000 spectators.

The women's national team (coached by Gero Bisanz) played its first game (as West Germany) on November 10, 1982, against Switzerland. Germany won the match 5–1. Two players who scored in the game would eventually become coaches for the national team.

In 1989 West Germany hosted the 1989 European Competition for Women's Football. The German team beat the Italian team on a penalty shoot-off. This was the first women's football game broadcast live in Germany. On July 2, 1989, the German team beat the favored Norwegian team 4–1 in front of 23,000 spectators. This was an attendance record for a German women's team that would last until May 24, 2008, when 27,460 spectators watched 1. FFC Frankfurt defeat Umeå IK 3–2 in the UEFA Women's Cup.

National competition 
As a result of the national team's success in the 1989 European Competition, in 1990 the DFB founded the first women's Bundesliga with twenty teams divided into two groups, a Northern Conference and a Southern Conference. The Bundesliga was reduced to a single league of twelve teams in 1997. However, with the growing strength of Regionalliga compared to the Bundesliga, the DFB founded Second Bundesliga in 2004. The Second Bundesliga contained twenty-four teams divided into two groups.

National team

The Germany women's national football team, organised by the DFB, are the only women's team ever to have successfully defended the FIFA Women's World Cup, winning in 2003 under coach Tina Theune-Meyer and 2007 under Silvia Neid. They also won eight UEFA Women's Championships (1989, 1991, 1995, 1997, 2001, 2005, 2009, 2013).

Women's Honours

Major competitions 
FIFA Women's World Cup
 Champions (2): 2003, 2007
 Runners-up (1): 1995
 Fourth place (2): 1991, 2015

UEFA Women's Championship
 Champions (8): 1989, 1991, 1995, 1997, 2001, 2005, 2009, 2013
 Runners-up (1): 2022
 Fourth place (1): 1993

Summer Olympic Games
 Gold Medal (1): 2016
 Bronze Medal (3): 2000, 2004, 2008

See also

 Football in Germany
 German women's football league system
 Bans of women's association football

References